KROY (1410 AM) is a radio station broadcasting a 70s and 80s pop/rock|adult standards/MOR format. Licensed to San Saba, Texas, United States, the station is currently owned by Suzanne Henderson, and features programming from Westwood One.

References

External links

ROY